Česnauskis is a Lithuanian surname. It is a variant of Polish surname Czesnowski. and may refer to:

 Antanas Algimantas Česnauskis (1936–2008), Lithuanian chess master
 Deividas Česnauskis (born 1981), Lithuanian footballer
 Edgaras Česnauskis (born 1984), Lithuanian footballer

Lithuanian-language surnames